Claudio Ariel del Plá (born 8 September 1959) is a member of the provincial legislature of Salta Province in Argentina.

He was elected for a 4-year term in 2009, as a candidate of the Partido Obrero in the provincial capital, and was re-elected in 2013.

In 2011 he came 4th in the election for governor of Salta Province.  He will be the PO's candidate for governor at the next election.

See also 
Pablo Sebastian Lopez

External links 
list of deputies from Salta province website 

Workers' Party (Argentina) politicians
People from Salta Province
Living people
1959 births